Kathleen Mavourneen is a 1937 British-Irish musical drama film directed by Norman Lee and starring Sally O'Neil, Tom Burke and Jack Daly. The story had been filmed several times previously, including a silent version (1919), starring Theda Bara and a previous 1930 Tiffany talkie also starring Sally O'Neil. This version, also known as "Kathleen", was filmed in Ireland, and features the character of Old Mother Riley who appeared in her own film series. It was shot at Welwyn Studios.

Plot
Kathleen O'Moore returns home to rural Ireland and finds she has rivals for her affections in the shape of poor boy  Michael Rooney (Tom Burke) and wealthy squire Dennis O'Dwyer (Jack Daly). The two rivals in love team up to rescue Kathleen from her unpleasant aunt (Ethel Gryffies), who has arranged a loveless but profitable marriage for the girl.

Partial cast
 Sally O'Neil as Kathleen O'Moore
 Tom Burke as Michael Rooney
 Jack Daly as Dennis O'Dwyer
 Sara Allgood as Mary Ellen O'Dwyer
 Jeanne Stuart as Barbara Fitzpatrick
 Ethel Griffies as Hannah O'Dwyer
 Pat Noonan as Sean O'Dwyer
 Arthur Lucan as Old Mother Riley
 Kitty McShane as Kitty Riley
 Fred Duprez as Walter Bryant

Critical reception
The New York Times said, "An Irish-made picture it is, as flavorsome in its dialogue and occasional glimpses of country life as a horse fair in County Cork; and as silly and sentimental in its story as a poor imitation of Hollywood can be." Allmovie calls the film, "a fanciful bit of blarney predicated on the ballad "Kathleen Mavourneen."

References

Bibliography
 Low, Rachael. Filmmaking in 1930s Britain. George Allen & Unwin, 1985.
 Wood, Linda. British Films, 1927-1939. British Film Institute, 1986.

External links

1937 films
British musical drama films
Irish musical drama films
1930s musical drama films
1930s English-language films
English-language Irish films
Films directed by Norman Lee
Films set in Ireland
Films set in Liverpool
Films shot at Welwyn Studios
British black-and-white films
Irish black-and-white films
1937 drama films
1930s British films